Grazin' is the debut studio album by music group The Friends of Distinction, released in 1969 on RCA Victor.

Commercial performance
The album peaked at No. 10 on the R&B albums chart. It also reached No. 35 on the Billboard 200. The album features the single, "Grazing in the Grass", which peaked at No. 3 on the Billboard Hot 100 and No. 5 on the Hot Soul Singles chart. A second single, "Going in Circles" also charted at No. 15 on the Billboard Hot 100 and No. 3 on the Hot Soul Singles chart.

Track listing

Personnel

Ray Cork Jr. - arrangements, conductor 
Floyd Butler, Harry Elston, Jessica Cleaves, Barbara Jean Love – vocals
Al Casey – guitar
Arthur G. Wright – guitar
Max Bennett – electric bass
Jim Gordon – drums, percussion 
King Errison – congas
Gary Coleman – percussion
Jack Arnold – percussion
John Audino – trumpet, flugelhorn
Buddy Childers – trumpet, flugelhorn
Dalton Smith – trumpet, flugelhorn
Bill Peterson – trumpet, flugelhorn
Bud Brisbois – trumpet
David Duke – French horn
Dick Leith – trombone
Plas Johnson – flute, clarinet
Jim Horn – flute, tenor saxophone
William Green – flute, piccolo
Gene Cipriano – flute, oboe, English horn, piccolo
Brad Bauder – tenor saxophone, clarinet
Jimmy Getzoff – violin
Harry Bluestone – violin
Paul Shure – violin
Garry Nuttycombe – viola
Douglas Davis – cello
Catherine Gotthoffer – harp

Charts
Album

Singles

References

External links 
 

1969 debut albums
The Friends of Distinction albums
RCA Victor albums